Marcelo Alfonso Díaz Rojas (born 30 December 1986) is a Chilean professional footballer who plays as a central midfielder for Chilean Primera División side Audax Italiano.

Díaz came through Universidad de Chile youth academy, and was promoted to the first team in 2004, when he was 18. Making over 150 appearances Díaz was an integral part of the team with the club that won five titles including three consecutive national championships and the 2011 Copa Sudamericana; the club's first international title. In 2012, he moved to Swiss side Basel, where he won two consecutive league titles, before moving to Hamburger SV in 2015.

Díaz has earned over 60 caps for Chile since his senior debut in 2011, and represented the nation at the 2014 FIFA World Cup as well as the 2015 Copa América, winning the latter while being named in the Team of the tournament.

Díaz has earned the nickname of "South American Xavi", as both of them have a great ball control capabilities and excellent passing skills. In June 2015, he scored a 91st minute free-kick goal that helped save Hamburger SV from its first ever relegation from the Bundesliga and is considered to be one of the most important goals in the club's 128-year history.

Club career

Universidad de Chile

Early years
Díaz began his career in Universidad de Chile youth academy, being immediately accepted by Jorge Cabrera, then coach of the club's lower divisions. He played in the Club Julio Covarrubias of Padre Hurtado before arriving to Universidad de Chile, with Díaz saying that he felt kind of lucky for being accepted in the club, because he was a very low profile player. He progressed over all categories in the lower divisions, mainly acting as a playmaker. He was promoted to the first team in 2004 at the age of 18, but he was only called to three matches and not debuted in any of them. The next season, Díaz made his professional debut in a 3–2 loss with Everton for the first week of the 2005 Apertura Tournament. In the 2006 season, he played 29 matches between the Apertura and the Clausura Tournament.

After the one season, in the Apertura Tournament 2008, Díaz was a frequently starter in the squad of Arturo Salah, and scored his first professional goal with the club on 23 March, in a 3–2 loss with Huachipato, it was his first goal for Universidad de Chile. During the year he played 36 games between the Apertura and Clausura tournaments. After of the departure of Arturo Salah and the arrival of the Uruguayan coach Sergio Markarián, Díaz was used as a left back, unlike Salah that used him as an attacking midfielder. On 28 January 2009, he scored his first international goal in a 1–0 home victory to Pachuca. In the first semester of the season he won his first professional title, the Apertura Tournament, that his club won after beating 1–0 Unión Española in the playoffs final. The next season, now with the arrival of Gerardo Pelusso as the coach, Díaz was being used as right back and only played five league games.

On 13 August 2010, the player confirmed his incorporation to Deportes La Serena. There, he returned to the midfield, being deployed as an attacking midfielder. On 22 August, Díaz debuted in a 4–0 home win over Santiago Wanderers at La Portada Stadium. In his third match for the club against Audax Italiano, he scored his side's goal in a 2–1 defeat in the 86th minute. On 3 October, Díaz scored a brace in a 3–3 draw with Everton, being red carded in the 91st minute. After a one match absence, and his return in the game against Unión Española, he again scored his side's goal in a 2–1 away defeat with Universidad Católica. On 28 November, Díaz had a successful performance against Cobresal, being named the man-of-the-match and scoring a goal in a 2–0 win. Having finished the 2010 season, Díaz had a deal with Huachipato for a loan, but Universidad de Chile's new coach Jorge Sampaoli wanted him to play for his team in 2011 and the player remained in the club.

Breakthrough seasons

Díaz began the season as a substitute player replacing to Guillermo Marino in all second halves of a game, but due to his good performances, he ended up replacing Marino on the starting lineup. On 4 June 2011, he scored a wonderful 26-yard free-kick versus O'Higgins, in Universidad de Chile's amazing 7–1 rout for the playoff's semi-final. Following the title obtained in the Apertura Tournament and the departure of Felipe Seymour to Italian Serie A side Genoa, Díaz started to play in Seymour's former position in the starting lineup as a central midfielder, with a more defensive role.

When the Clausura Tournament began, former Universidad de Chile midfielder Manuel Iturra was heavy linked with the club, to replace to Seymour, but Sampaoli decided finally against Iturra and for Díaz, who with the given confidence stepped up his game and became one of the key players of the team. His great performances in the local tournament and in the 2011 Copa Sudamericana caught the eye of national team's coach Claudio Borghi to play in the 2014 World Cup qualifiers. On 19 October, Díaz played in the Copa Sudamericana's round of 16 match against Flamengo. In that match, Universidad de Chile historically beat 4–0 as visitors, something never done by a Chilean team. In the second leg match, Díaz scored the only goal of the game in a 1–0 win at Estadio Nacional, winning the man of the match award. The next game of his club against the rivals, Colo-Colo, and he again was the man of the match in a 2–2 away draw. In that same match, Díaz was punished by the Anfp for obscene gestures to the Garra Blanca, the barra brava of Colo-Colo. After his performances, he was called up by Borghi for play against the Uruguay national football team at Centenario Stadium for the World Cup qualifiers. On 23 November, for the semi-finals of the Copa Sudamericana against Vasco da Gama, Díaz played in a 1–1 away draw at São Januário Stadium. He played an important role in the match, winning important balls in the middle of the pitch and assisting Osvaldo González, with a free kick to score the equalizing goal in the 79th minute. In the second leg game against the Brazilians, Díaz was named once again the man of the match in a 2–0 win. In the next game against LDU Quito for the first leg final, he made another assist to Eduardo Vargas, who scored the only goal of game. On 14 December, in the final of the tournament, Díaz played a good role in a 3–0 win over LDU, being crowned as the best champion of this tournament. According to the South American media, they compared to Universidad de Chile with Barcelona and Díaz with Xavi. Winning the Clausura Tournament, Universidad de Chile made a successful season earning three titles in one year, with Díaz as one of the key players of the season along with Johnny Herrera, Eduardo Vargas, Marcos González and José Rojas.

On 4 January 2012, the club received a US$1.5 million bid of Argentine Primera División side Newell's Old Boys for Díaz, but the same player rejected the deal, to play the Copa Libertadores, being also retained with pay rise of part of directive. He was candidate for be the club's captain, with the departures of José Rojas and Marcos González to the Brazilian Série A, but finally with the return of Rojas to the club because of problems with his new contract, Pepe remained as captain. Díaz started the season of fine form scoring a penalty goal in a 3–1 win over his old club Deportes La Serena in the first game of Universidad de Chile at the Apertura Tournament. On 25 February, he missed a penalty kick against O'Higgins in a 3–0 loss, that was saved by the adversary's keeper Luis Marín for the fifth week of the Apertura. On 10 March, he played a great match giving two notable assists in a 6–0 thrashing over Audax Italiano, then being called up by Borghi to the national team for play the Copa del Pacífico against Peru at Arica and Tacna. On 4 April, he was named the man of the match in a Libertadores 1–0 victory over Godoy Cruz at Mendoza, making another excellent match for his team on 29 April in the Chilean derby against Colo-Colo, in where he scored the first goal of the game and also made three assists, after a successful free kick in a 5–0 home win at the Estadio Nacional. On 9 May, was confirmed that Díaz was sold to Swiss Super League side Basel for $4 million. On 11 May, he scored a 30-yard goal in a 6–0 rout over Deportivo Quito for the Libertadores.

FC Basel
After winning the Apertura with Universidad de Chile, Díaz joined the Swiss side Basel in the summer of 2012, on a four-year deal. He joined Basel's first team during their 2012–13 season under head coach Heiko Vogel. Díaz played his club debut on 17 July in the 2–0 away win against Flora Tallinn in the 1st Leg of the second qualifying round to the 2012–13 UEFA Champions League and he received good compliments. He played his domestic league debut for the club in the home game in the St. Jakob-Park four days later, on 21 July 2012, as Basel played a 2–2 draw with Luzern. Another three days later, on 24 July, Díaz scored his first goal for his new team during the return leg against Flora Tallinn. It was a direct free kick and it was the final goal in the teams 3–0 win. He scored his first league goal for them during the 2–1 away win in the Stade Olympique de la Pontaise against Lausanne-Sport on 17 February 2013.

At the end of the Swiss Super League season 2012–13 he won the Championship title with the team. In the 2012–13 Swiss Cup Basel reached the final, but were runners up behind Grasshopper Club, being defeated 4–3 on penalties, following a 1–1 draw after extra time. Basel had started in the 2012–13 UEFA Champions League in the qualifying rounds. But were knocked out of the competition by CFR Cluj in the play-off round. They then continued in the 2012–13 UEFA Europa League group stage. Ending the group in second position, Basel continued in the knockout phase. Winning in the round of 32 against Dnipro Dnipropetrovsk, Basel were matched against Zenit St. Petersburg in the round of 16. Following a 2–0 home win, the second leg was played in the Petrovsky Stadium. The home team took a goal lead in the 30th minute and after his second yellow card in the 44th minute Diaz was dismissed, but Basel held the result and advanced. Beating Tottenham Hotspur in a thrilling quarter-final, 4–4 on aggregate then 4–1 on penalties, Basel advanced as far as the semi-finals, there being matched against the reigning UEFA Champions League holders Chelsea. Chelsea won both games advancing 5–2 on aggregate, eventually winning the competition.

At the start of their 2013–14 season season Díaz was member of the Basel team that won the 2013 Uhrencup, beating Red Star Belgrade in the final. Basel joined the 2013–14 Champions League in the qualifying rounds and they advanced to the group stage. Finishing in third place in their group, Basel qualified for Europa League knockout phase and here they advanced as far as the quarter-finals. But eventually they were beaten by Valencia 5-3 on aggregate, after extra time. At the end of the 2013–14 Super League season Díaz won his second league championship with Basel. The team also reached the final of the Swiss Cup on 21 April 2014. Gastón Sauro and Giovanni Sio were both sent off as Basel fell to rivals FC Zürich 2–0 in added extra time, after a goalless 90 minutes. 

The 2014–15 season was also a successful one for Basel, but for Díaz it was an unlucky and unthankful season under their new trainer Paulo Sousa. Despite the fact that Basel won the championship later that season and despite the fact that Basel had entered the Champions League in the group stage reaching the knockout phase on 9 December 2014 as they managed a 1–1 draw at Anfield against Liverpool, Díaz totaled just 24 appearances, the larger part as substitute, during the first half of the season, 13 (from 18) League, 2 Cup (of 3), and just 3 (of 6) in the Champions League, as well 6 further appearances in test games. Because Sousa did not rely upon Díaz, he was forced to leave the club during the winter break.

On 2 February 2015 Basel announced that Díaz had joined Hamburger SV. During his time with the club, Díaz played a total of 118 games for Basel scoring a total of 15 goals. 58 of these games were in the Swiss Super League, 10 in the Swiss Cup, 51 in the UEFA competitions (Champions League and Europa League) and 19 were friendly games. He scored seven goals in the domestic league, two in the cup, four in the European games and the other two were scored during the test games.

Hamburger SV
On 2 February 2015, Díaz signed for German Bundesliga club Hamburger SV on a three-and-a-half-year deal. On 1 June 2015, he scored his first goal for the club in its relegation play-off match which took place at the end of the 2014–15 Bundesliga season, against Karlsruher SC. Many Hamburg fans consider Díaz's 91st minute free-kick goal which helped save Hamburg from its first ever relegation to be one of the most important goals ever scored in the club's 128-year history. After the match, it was revealed that Rafael van der Vaart, Hamburg's captain and first choice for free-kicks, was to take the kick. Diaz, however, spontaneously told Van der Vaart that he could take a shot "tomorrow, my friend" and went on to perform the free-kick himself.

Celta de Vigo
In January 2016, Díaz transferred to Spanish La Liga side Celta de Vigo. He scored his first goal for the club on 16 April 2017, in a 3–0 away win against Granada CF.

On 17 August 2017, Díaz left Celta by mutual consent.

Pumas UNAM
On 17 August 2017, Díaz signed a contract with Liga MX side Pumas UNAM as a free agent.

Libertad
In June 2021, Paraguay's D10 announced that would join Libertad. In July 2021, the announcement was made official by the club.

International career

Youth
In January 2005, aged 19, Díaz caught the attention of José Sulantay, who called up the player to play the South American Youth Championship held in Colombia. He made his U-20 debut during the championship. Following the qualification of the Chilean national youth team to the 2005 FIFA World Youth Championship, he was in the 23-man squad to play the world championship, but he didn't play during the tournament.

Senior
Six years after his participation with the U-20 team, on 7 September 2011, Díaz was called up by Claudio Borghi to play in the 2014 World Cup qualification against Uruguay and Paraguay, in place of Carlos Carmona, who was banned for his participation in the scandal of "Bautizazo". On 11 November, Díaz officially debuted for the Chile senior team in a 4–0 away loss at Centenario Stadium, being replaced by Milovan Mirosevic in the 61st minute. Due to his good performances for Universidad de Chile, he was called up for the match against Ghana at PPL Park, in where he played well in a 1–1 draw. He started again the qualifiers against Bolivia and Venezuela, both 2–0 away victories, where Díaz excelled.

2015 Copa América
Díaz started all six matches in the 2015 Copa América, helping Chile win in a penalty shootout against Argentina, to win their first major international honor. For his performances he was named in the Team of the tournament.

Career statistics

International goals
Scores and results list Chile's goal tally first.

Honours

Club
Universidad de Chile
Chilean Primera División (4): 2009 Apertura, 2011 Apertura, 2011 Clausura, 2012 Apertura
Copa Sudamericana (1): 2011

Basel
Swiss Super League (2): 2012–13, 2013–14
Swiss Cup: Runner-up 2012–13, 2013–14

Racing Club
Superliga Argentina (1): 2018–19
Trofeo de Campeones (1): 2019

Libertad
Paraguayan Primera División (1): 2022 Apertura

International
Chile
Copa América (2): 2015, 2016
FIFA Confederations Cup: Runner-up 2017
 (1):

Individual
Primera División de Chile Team of the Season : 2011
Copa América Team of the Tournament: 2015.

References

External links

Marcelo Díaz at Football-Lineups

1986 births
Living people
Footballers from Santiago
Chilean footballers
Chilean expatriate footballers
Chile international footballers
Chile under-20 international footballers
Association football midfielders
Chilean Primera División players
Swiss Super League players
Bundesliga players
La Liga players
Liga MX players
Argentine Primera División players
Paraguayan Primera División players
Universidad de Chile footballers
Deportes La Serena footballers
FC Basel players
Hamburger SV players
RC Celta de Vigo players
Club Universidad Nacional footballers
Racing Club de Avellaneda footballers
Club Libertad footballers
Expatriate footballers in Switzerland
Expatriate footballers in Germany
Expatriate footballers in Spain
Expatriate footballers in Mexico
Expatriate footballers in Argentina
Expatriate footballers in Paraguay
Chilean expatriate sportspeople in Switzerland
Chilean expatriate sportspeople in Germany
Chilean expatriate sportspeople in Spain
Chilean expatriate sportspeople in Mexico
Chilean expatriate sportspeople in Argentina
Chilean expatriate sportspeople in Paraguay
2014 FIFA World Cup players
2015 Copa América players
Copa América Centenario players
2017 FIFA Confederations Cup players
Copa América-winning players